According to the modern Russian  Criminal Code,  only intentional killing of another human is considered as a murder (Russian убийство transliteration ubiystvo). The following types of murder are  defined:
  Murder per se (article 105 of Criminal Code):
 common  corpus delicti (with no aggravating circumstances listed below).  Punished with a sentence between 6 and 15 years
 qualified  corpus delicti. Punished with a sentence between 8 and 20 years, life sentence, or death penalty. Aggravating circumstances:
a) against two  or more people;
b) against person on public duty or their  relatives;
c) killing of hostage, kidnapped or  helpless person;
d) killing of pregnant;
e) committed in  a cruel way;
f) committed in a socially dangerous way;
g) motivated  by a blood feud (vendetta);
h) committed by a group of persons, a group of persons under a preliminary conspiracy, or an organized group;
i) for a  profit, including contract killing, or connected with a robbery, extort or banditry;
j)  with a rowdy motive;
k) to cover or secure another crime,
l) connected  with a rape or sexual assault;
m) hate crime;
n) with the  aim to use organs or tissues of victim.
 Privileged  types of murder:
 Of newborn child by mother (article 106  of Criminal  Code), punished with a sentence  up to 5 years.
 In affect state (art. 107), up to 3 years  (up to 5 years for multiple killing).
 Exceeding  reasonable level of self-defense (art. 108), up to 2 years.

There  are some other articles of criminal code, that provide special  punishment for crimes connected with intentional kills:
 seizure of  hostages;
 terrorism;
 sabotage;
- punished with a  sentence between 15 and 20 years, or life.
 genocide;
 encroachment on person on public or government duty;
 encroachment on law officer or soldier;
 encroachment on person administering justice or engaged in a preliminary investigation.
- punished with a sentence between 12 and  20 years or life sentence.

Separately considered  actions that cause unpremeditated death of another person:
 accident  killing (art. 108, punished with a limitation of freedom or imprisonment  up to 5 years -  depends on circumstances);
 death in a traffic accident (art. 263-264, punished  with an imprisonment up to 9 years if aggravating circumstances such as  alcohol or drugs intoxication or multiply victims exist, also provided  disqualification from driving)

Assault that has no purpose  to kill, but causes a death of victim, formally is not considered as a  murder, but punishment for it almost not distinguished from common  murder (art. 111 part 4 provides punishment with a sentence between 5  and 15 years, so only lower limit of punishment slightly easier).

Article  110 of the criminal code also provides punishment for driving a person  to suicide (by blackmail, threats or cruelty).

See also
List of murder laws by country

Russia
Russian criminal law